Yevgeniy Shidlovskiy (born 13 January 1991) is a Belarusian professional football player currently playing for Smolevichi.

On 16 January 2020, the BFF banned Shidlovskiy for 12 months for his involvement in the match fixing.

References

External links
 
 
 Profile at FC Gorodeya website

1991 births
Living people
Belarusian footballers
Association football midfielders
FC Torpedo-BelAZ Zhodino players
FC Lida players
FC Vitebsk players
FC Granit Mikashevichi players
FC Gorodeya players
FC Smolevichi players